A Picture of Her Tombstone is a 1996 crime novel by American writer Thomas Lipinski, set in 1990s Pittsburgh, Pennsylvania.

It tells the story of Pittsburgh private detective Carroll Dorsey, who is making ends meet by tending bar, when an old friend tells him about a Mrs. Leneski, who wants Dorsey to find her granddaughter, Maritsa Durant. The quest leads him into a blue-collar neighborhood, a seedy drug underground, and an encounter with a beautiful state cop.

The novel is the second in a series of four Carroll Dorsey mysteries.

Sources
Contemporary Authors Online. The Gale Group, 2006.

External links
  Book Page @ Amazon.com

1996 American novels
American crime novels
Novels set in Pittsburgh